Ramazan Tavşancıoğlu (born 7 June 1984 in Melbourne, Australia) is a Turkish Australian footballer who plays for Nunawading City FC in the National Premier Leagues Victoria 3. He plays as a defender.

Club career
A youth player at the Melbourne Knights, in 2003 Tavşancıoğlu received a two-week trial with Turkish Super League club Ankaragücü. After impressing coaching staff at the club he signed a four-year deal. However, he left at the conclusion of the first year of his contract after feeling unsettled, making just one appearance in his time at the club.

Upon returning to Australia, Tavşancıoğlu began playing with South Melbourne in the Victorian Premier League. Tavsancioglu was invited to join A-League club Melbourne Victory on a short-term contract on 30 December 2005. He played four games as a back-up player for the Victory due to injuries to regular squad members, before recommencing his tenure with South Melbourne in the VPL, where he played in South Melbourne's victory over Altona Magic in the 2006 Grand Final.

After a successful trial, he was signed as a short-term injury replacement by A-League outfit North Queensland Fury in November 2010 after a five-year hiatus from the league to provide defensive cover for the injured Eric Akoto and Chris Grossman.

He spent the 2011 and 2012 VPL seasons with Oakleigh Cannons, 2013 with Southern Stars FC and then the first two years of the new NPL league with Dandenong Thunder SC.

After Thunder's relegation from the top flight at the end of 2015, Rama then signed for ambitious league heavyweight Hume City FC.

Honours
With South Melbourne:
  Victorian Premier League Championship: 2006
 NPL Victoria Team of the Week Round 2 2017

References

Ramazan Tavşancıoğlu Melbourne Victory profile
Ramazan Tavşancıoğlu Details at Turkish Football Federation

1984 births
Living people
Australian people of Turkish descent
Soccer players from Melbourne
Australian expatriate soccer players
A-League Men players
Port Melbourne SC players
MKE Ankaragücü footballers
Melbourne Knights FC players
Melbourne Victory FC players
South Melbourne FC players
Northern Fury FC players
Hume City FC players
Avondale FC players
Altona Magic SC players
Association football defenders
Australian soccer players
Australian expatriate sportspeople in Turkey
Expatriate footballers in Turkey